James William McGhee (21 August 1930 – October 2019) was a Scottish footballer who played on the left wing or at centre forward. He appeared in the Scottish League for Kilmarnock and Morton and in the English League for Darlington and Newport County. He also played for Southern League club Barry Town, and for Ballymena United of the Irish League, for whom he scored one of the goals as they beat Linfield 2–0 to win the 1957–58 Irish Cup.

References

1930 births
2019 deaths
Footballers from Motherwell
Scottish footballers
Association football forwards
Forth Wanderers F.C. players
Kilmarnock F.C. players
Darlington F.C. players
Barry Town United F.C. players
Newport County A.F.C. players
Greenock Morton F.C. players
Ballymena United F.C. players
Scottish Football League players
English Football League players
Southern Football League players
NIFL Premiership players